Gila is a genus of fish belonging to the family Cyprinidae, native to the United States and Mexico.  Species of Gila are collectively referred to as western chubs. The chiselmouth is a close relative (Simons & Mayden 1997), as are members of the genus Siphateles. Several members of the genus are endangered or extinct due to loss of habitat causing by diversion or overuse of water resources, particularly in the western United States.

Species
 Gila atraria (Girard, 1856) (Utah chub)
 Gila brevicauda S. M. Norris, J. M. Fischer & W. L. Minckley, 2003 (Shorttail chub)
 Gila coerulea (Girard, 1856) (Blue chub)
 Gila conspersa Garman, 1881 (Nazas chub)
 †Gila crassicauda (S. F. Baird & Girard, 1854) (Thicktail chub (extinct: late 1950s))
 Gila cypha R. R. Miller, 1946 (Humpback chub)
 Gila ditaenia R. R. Miller, 1945 (Sonora chub)
 Gila elegans S. F. Baird & Girard, 1853 (Bonytail chub, Bonytail)
 Gila eremica DeMarais, 1991 (Desert chub)
 Gila intermedia (Girard, 1856) (Gila chub)
 Gila minacae Meek, 1902 (Mexican roundtail chub)
 Gila modesta (Garman, 1881) (Salinas chub)
 Gila nigra Cope, 1875 (Headwater chub)
 Gila nigrescens (Girard, 1856) (Chihuahua chub)
 Gila orcuttii (C. H. Eigenmann & R. S. Eigenmann, 1890) (Arroyo chub)
 Gila pandora (Cope, 1872) (Rio Grande chub)
 Gila pulchra (Girard, 1856) (Conchos chub)
 Gila purpurea (Girard, 1856) (Yaqui chub)
 Gila robusta S. F. Baird & Girard, 1853 (Roundtail chub)
 Gila robusta jordani V. M. Tanner, 1950 (Pahranagut roundtail chub)
 Gila robusta robusta S. F. Baird & Girard, 1853 (Roundtail chub)
 Gila seminuda Cope & Yarrow, 1875 (Virgin chub)

References
 
  (1997): Phylogenetic Relationships of the Creek Chubs and the Spine-Fins: an Enigmatic Group of North American Cyprinid Fishes (Actinopterygii: Cyprinidae). Cladistics 13(3): 187–205.  (HTML abstract)

 
Chubs (fish)
Taxa named by Spencer Fullerton Baird
Taxa named by Charles Frédéric Girard